Echinochloa muricata is a species of grass known by the common names rough barnyard grass and American barnyard grass. It is native to Eurasia and much of North America.

It is an annual grass growing one half to one meter in height.

References

External links
USDA Plants Profile
Illinois Wildflowers: var. muricata
Photo gallery

muricata
Grasses of North America
Grasses of Canada
Grasses of Mexico
Grasses of the United States
Flora of Europe
Flora of Asia
Plants described in 1812